John T. Klemmer (born July 3, 1946) is an American saxophonist, composer, songwriter, and arranger.

He was born in Chicago, Illinois, United States, and began playing guitar at the age of five and alto saxophone at the age of 11. His other early interests included graphics and visual art, writing, dance, puppetry, painting, sculpting, and poetry. He studied at the Art Institute of Chicago and began touring with midwestern "ghost big bands" (Les Elgart, Woody Herman) as well as playing with small local jazz and rock groups. After switching to tenor saxophone in high school, Klemmer played with commercial small groups and big bands in Chicago while leading his own groups and touring.

Biography
Klemmer had extensive studies in music, taking private lessons as a youth and in college in piano, conducting, harmony, theory, composition, arranging, clarinet, flute and classical and jazz saxophone. He studied saxophone and jazz improvisation with noted Chicago saxophonist and teacher Joe Daley. He attended the Interlochen's National Music Camp. The year he graduated from high school, Klemmer was signed by producer Esmond Edwards at Chess Records, eventually recording five albums with their Cadet label, including his innovative hit 1969 album, Blowin Gold (co-produced by ex-Rolling Stones producer Marshall Chess). This album was considered by many as the first of the jazz/rock fusion genre; follow-up albums introduced innovative rock rhythms, sounds and production techniques and debuted electronic effects with the saxophone that became his now "trademark" delay sound.

Klemmer led his own groups touring the U.S. using the cream of the Chicago sideman such as Jodie Christian, Wilbur Campbell and Cleveland Eaton, while occasionally performing in tandem with good friends such as jazz artists Eddie Harris and Oscar Brashear, arranger Les Hooper and rock artists such as James William Guercio (later to produce Blood, Sweat & Tears and Chicago) and various rock artists such as guitarist Harvey Mandel. Klemmer did his first PBS special for WTTW TV Chicago. He was also a busy sideman, exploring every genre of music. He then moved to Los Angeles the following year and for a very brief time was a key soloist and arranger with Don Ellis's  big band touring Europe and toured Africa with Oliver Nelson for the State Department, while also working with such diverse artists of a variety of musical genres such as Tim Buckley and others. He studied film scoring with Albert Harris and vocal lessons with Seth Riggs. Continuing always through the events described, Klemmer continuously lead his own small groups touring across the U.S. further developing his unique sound, style and concepts. He primarily focused on his jazz rock fusion styles, returning briefly to more traditional jazz, and then switching to a more "intense" so-called "Coltraneish" approach upon leaving Chess Records, and signing with and recording four albums for Impulse! Records.

He performed at the Newport and Monterey Jazz Festivals, Antibes Jazz Festival, Carnegie Hall, Tanglewood, and Montreux Jazz Festival plus TV shows the Midnight Special and Rock Concert. Klemmer has composed all songs for many of his albums, amassing a large and valuable publishing catalog, but he has also collaborated and co-written musically and as lyricist with many pop songwriters, such as David Batteau, with the UK hit "Walk In Love", recorded by The Manhattan Transfer, Danny O'Keefe, Clint Holmes, Pamela Oland, and many others. After another of his many controversial sabbaticals, he again changed musical direction by then moving to ABC/MCA Records briefly returning to his early R&B and  pop roots. Klemmer then went on to earn crossover appeal with his now landmark series of "Touch" recordings. Klemmer and the "Touch" series of recordings are regarded by many as paving the way and being "the founder" of the smooth jazz genre, some anointing him "The Ambassador of Cool". His continuous fast changing of musical directions throughout his career created some controversy, confusion and false speculative motivational assumptions and judgements, from his primarily earlier jazz purist audience, primarily, with the now historic "Touch" series of recordings. His managerial associations with noted former Doors manager, Bill Siddons and with Faith Hill, Keith Urban, and James Taylor manager, Gary Borman, helped Klemmer expose his music to a growing number of pop, rock, R&B and adult contemporary audiences. He toured extensively as headliner and with "package tours" with George Benson, and Herbie Hancock plus numerous TV appearances arranged by the William Morris Agency. He expanded his musical palette to include, kalimba, flutes, keyboards, percussion and solo vocal.

At this time he further developed his innovative Solo Sax Concept resulting in the now landmark recording of Cry ushering in, thought by many, the "New Age Music Spiritual" genre, with some now calling him the "Sax God". In 1979, he briefly returned to his earlier jazz roots recording the "straight ahead jazz" 2-CD offering, Nexus – For Duo & Trio, now considered by many a classic, at personal request of Clive Davis for former Arista/Bluebird/RCA Records, followed by occasional special recording projects such as duo recordings with Joe Sample and Oscar Castro-Neves. Following another of his sabbaticals he then, upon personal urging of legendary pop and rock music mogul Joe Smith, moved to Elektra Records, recording five albums. After another brief sabbatical he then returned to Verve/GRP for Universal Records where his primary vast catalog of recordings reside. Klemmer then took his longest and most controversial sabbatical, causing numerous false rumors of personal and health problems as he continued writing, recording and working with new digital technologies, plus returning to vocal studies with noted Macy Gray and Brandi vocal teacher, Roger Burnley. He then returned to recording as guest soloist with such New Age artists as 3rd Force, David Arkenstone, and Craig Chaquico, while also returning to his performing, touring and recording career.

Klemmer founded his own record label, Touch Records, for "special projects & releases only" with the compact disc and digital releases of Making Love - Vol. 1, Rio - Vol. 1, and Rio - Vol. 2 as an adjunct to his major label activity such as the Verve/GRP Records release of The Very Best of John Klemmer (6024 9883194 6) from 2005, including three newly recorded bonus tracks from future releases. Klemmer's music has been sampled by a large number of DJ, hip-hop, and rap artists primarily focused on his early Cadet/Chess recordings.

Discography

As leader
 Involvement: The John Klemmer Quartets (Cadet, 1967)
 And We Were Lovers (Cadet, 1968)
 Blowin' Gold (Cadet Concept, 1969)
 All the Children Cried (Cadet Concept, 1969)
 Eruptions (Cadet Concept, 1970)
 Constant Throb (ABC/Impulse!, 1971)
 Waterfalls [live] (ABC/Impulse!, 1972)
 Intensity (ABC/Impulse!, 1973)
 Magic and Movement [live] (ABC/Impulse!, 1974)
 Fresh Feathers (ABC, 1974)
 Touch (ABC, 1975)
 Barefoot Ballet (ABC, 1976)
 Lifestyle (Living & Loving) (ABC, 1977)
 Arabesque (ABC, 1977)
 Solo Saxophone – Cry (ABC, 1978)
 Simpatico with Oscar Castro-Neves (JVC, 1978)
 Brazilia (ABC, 1979)
 Straight from the Heart (MCA/Nautilus, 1979)
 Nexus – For Duo And Trio (Arista/Novus, 1979)
 Magnificent Madness (Elektra, 1980)
 Hush (Elektra, 1981)
 Solo Saxophone II – Life (Elektra, 1981)
 Finesse (Elektra/Nautilus, 1981)
 Two Tone with Eddie Harris/Joe Sample/Phil Upchurch (Crusaders, 1982)
 Music (MCA, 1989)
 Making Love, Vol. 1 (Touch, 1998)

Compilations
 Magic Moments (Chess/GRT, 1976) - compilation of the three Cadet Concept albums.
 Mosaic: The Best of John Klemmer, Volume One (MCA, 1979)
 The Saxophone Player: The Best of John Klemmer, Volume II (The Impulse Years) (MCA, 1982)
 Blowin' Gold (Chess/All Platinum/Sugar Hill, 1982) - reissue of Magic Moments
 John Klemmer – Priceless Jazz #38 (GRP, 1999)

As sideman
With Don Ellis
 Autumn  (Columbia, 1968)
 Don Ellis at Fillmore (Columbia, 1970)
 The New Don Ellis Band Goes Underground (Columbia, 1969)

With others
 3rd Force, Force Field (Higher Octave Music, 1999)
 Steve Allen, Soulful Brass #2 (Flying Dutchman, 1969)
 Ambersunshower, Walter T. Smith (Gee Street, 1997)
 David Arkenstone, Return of the Guardians (Narada, 1996)
 Beastie Boys, Ill Communication (Capitol, 1994)
 Terence Boylan, Terence Boylan (Asylum, 1977)
 David Garfield, Jammin Outside the Box (Creatchy, 2018)
 Roy Haynes, Thank You Thank You (Galaxy, 1977)
 John Lee Hooker, Born in Mississippi, Raised Up in Tennessee (ABC, 1973)
 Osamu Kitajima, Masterless Samurai (Alfa, 1980)
 Gloria Lynne, I Don't Know How to Love Him (ABC/Impulse!, 1976)
 Ray Manzarek, The Whole Thing Started with Rock & Roll Now It's Out of Control (Mercury, 1974)
 Oliver Nelson, Black, Brown and Beautiful (Flying Dutchman, 1970)
 Art Pepper, Ballads by Four (Galaxy, 1981)
 Tom Scott, Foundation: The Dedication Series Vol. XIV (Impulse!/ABC, 1978)
 Dan Siegel, Nite Ride (Inner City, 1980)
 Tom Snow, Tom Snow (Capitol, 1976)
 Steely Dan, The Royal Scam (ABC, 1976)
 Nancy Wilson, Life, Love and Harmony (Capitol, 1979)
 Lauren Wood, Lauren Wood (Warner Bros., 1979)

References

External links
 Official website

1946 births
Living people
Musicians from Chicago
Jazz musicians from Illinois
21st-century American male musicians
21st-century American saxophonists
American jazz alto saxophonists
American jazz tenor saxophonists
American male jazz musicians
American male saxophonists
Smooth jazz saxophonists
Cadet Records artists
Elektra Records artists
Impulse! Records artists
MCA Records artists
Novus Records artists
Verve Records artists